Río Seco, Rio Seco, Rioseco or Seco River may refer to:

Argentina
Río Seco Department (province of Córdoba)
Villa de María del Río Seco, head town of the above
Río Seco (Argentina), a river
Río Seco, Tucumán, a settlement

Colombia
San Juan de Rioseco (Cundinamarca)

Panama
Río Seco, Panama Province

Puerto Rico
Río Seco, Puerto Rico, a river in southern Puerto Rico

Spain
Boadilla de Rioseco (province of Palencia)
Medina de Rioseco (province of Valladolid)
Rioseco de Tapia (province of León)
Rioseco de Soria (province of  Soria)
Rioseco Abbey, former monastery in Rioseco (Burgos)

See also 
 Arroyo Seco (disambiguation)